Jaleel "J. J." O'Brien (born April 8, 1992) is an American professional basketball player for KK Budućnost of the Prva A Liga. He played college basketball for San Diego State and the University of Utah.

High school career
O'Brien attended the Alta Loma High School in Rancho Cucamonga, California. As a senior, he averaged 24 points, 7.4 rebounds and 2.1 steals, earning a first-team all-league selection, being nominated for the McDonald's All-American and ended as Alta Loma's all-time leading scorer with 2,200 points.

College career
O'Brien began his basketball career with Utah. In his freshman season, he played in 22 games starting 21 averaging 6.4 points, 5.5 rebounds and 1.2 assists in 27.7 minutes after missing 9 games due to a broken foot.

The next year, O'Brien transferred to San Diego State and sat out that season. On his sophomore season, he played in all 34 games, starting 33 averaging 7.2 points on 52.6 percent shooting, 4.5 rebounds and 1.5 assists. He scored in double figures in 10 of his final 16 outings, including six of his final 11 games, ending with 13 double-figures scoring. He was the Mountain West Player of the Week on January 28.

As a junior, O'Brien played and started 35 of 36 games averaging a career-high 7.8 points and 4.7 rebounds also setting career highs in minutes played (27.9), free-throw percentage (.644) and three-point field-goal percentage (.278). All of this earned him an All-Mountain West Honorable Mention.

As a senior with the Aztecs, O'Brien averaged 10.3 points, 5.2 rebounds and 2.4 assists.

Professional career
After going undrafted in the 2015 NBA draft, O'Brien joined the Utah Jazz for the Utah Summer League, where he saw action in all three games, averaging 4.0 points and 2.3 rebounds in 13.0 minutes. He also played with Utah at the Las Vegas Summer League, owning averages of 4.6 points, 1.8 rebounds and 1.2 assists in 18.8 minutes. On August 28, 2015, he signed with the Jazz, but was later waived by the team on October 13 after appearing in one preseason game. On November 1, 2015, he was acquired by the Idaho Stampede of the NBA Development League as an affiliate player of the Jazz. On November 13, he made his professional debut in a 110–106 loss to the Rio Grande Valley Vipers, recording 12 points, three rebounds, two steals and two blocks in 42 minutes.

On January 16, 2016, O'Brien signed a 10-day contract with the Jazz. He made his NBA debut later that night against the Los Angeles Lakers, recording one rebound and one steal in four minutes of action. On January 26, he returned to Idaho after his contract with the Jazz expired. At the season's end, he earned NBA D-League All-Rookie Team honors.

In July 2016, O'Brien re-joined the Utah Jazz for the Utah Summer League, and then played for the Brooklyn Nets at the Las Vegas Summer League. On September 8, 2016, he signed with the Milwaukee Bucks, but was waived on October 22 after appearing in five preseason games. On October 31, he was re-acquired by the now Salt Lake City Stars.

On August 23, 2017, O'Brien was selected by the Agua Caliente Clippers in the NBA G League expansion draft. He averaged 15.9 points, 4.8 rebounds and 3.1 assists per game with the Clippers.

On August 7, 2018, O'Brien signed with BC Astana in Kazakhstan. 

He signed with Monaco of the LNB Pro A in 2019. O'Brien averaged 12.5 points, 3.4 rebounds and 1.7 assists per game, shooting 52% from the field and 74% from the foul line. He re-signed with the team on July 16, 2020.

On November 11, 2022, he signed with Nanterre 92 of the French Pro A.

Career statistics

|-
| align="left" | 
| align="left" | Utah
| 2 || 0 || 3.1 || .000 || - || - || 0.5 || - || .5 || - || 0.0
|-

Personal life
O'Brien is the son of Catherine O'Brien, a middle school teacher who played college basketball at Notre Dame. He has two sisters, Noelle and Malika.

References

External links
 San Diego State bio
 Utah Utes bio 

1992 births
Living people
American men's basketball players
Agua Caliente Clippers players
AS Monaco Basket players
Basketball players from San Diego
Idaho Stampede players
People from Rancho Cucamonga, California
Salt Lake City Stars players
San Diego State Aztecs men's basketball players
Small forwards
Sportspeople from San Bernardino County, California
Undrafted National Basketball Association players
Utah Jazz players
Utah Utes men's basketball players